João Correa da Rocha Airport  is the airport serving Marabá, Brazil.

During a transitional period, the airport is jointly operated by Infraero and AENA.

History
The airport was commissioned on May 20, 1978.

Previously operated by Infraero, on August 18, 2022 the consortium AENA won a 30-year concession to operate the airport.

Airlines and destinations

Access

See also

List of airports in Brazil

References

External links

Airports in Pará
Airports established in 1978
Marabá